Prorophora mongolica is a species of snout moth. It is found in China (Inner Mongolia, Gansu) and Mongolia.

The wingspan is 15–18 mm. This species is characterized by the forewing with yellowish brown basal field edged with black on outer margin posteriorly, pale yellowish brown along the veins between the antemedian and postmedian lines.

References

Phycitinae
Moths described in 1970